Mumbai WR railway division is one of the six railway divisions under Western Railway zone of Indian Railways. This railway division was formed on 5 November 1951 and its headquarter is located at Mumbai Central in the state of Maharashtra of India.

Vadodara railway division, Ahmedabad railway division, Bhavnagar railway division, Rajkot railway division and Ratlam railway division are the other five railway divisions under WR Zone headquartered at Churchgate, Mumbai.

List of railway stations and towns 
The list includes the stations under the Mumbai Central railway division and their station category.

References

 
Divisions of Indian Railways
1951 establishments in Bombay State